Pokrashen is a village in Akhuryan Municipality of the Shirak Province, Armenia.

Demographics

References 

Populated places in Shirak Province